Cooch Behar Palace, is a landmark in Cooch Behar city, West Bengal. It was designed after  the Italian Renaissance style of architecture  and was built in 1887, during the reign of Maharaja Nripendra Narayan of Koch dynasty. It is currently a museum.

History

The Cooch Behar Palace is noted for its elegance and grandeur. The Palace is fronted on the ground and first floors by a series of arcaded verandahs with their piers arranged alternately in single and double rows.

At the southern and northern ends, the Palace projects slightly and in the center is a projected porch providing an entrance to the Durbar Hall. The Hall has an elegantly shaped metal dome which is topped by a cylindrical louver type ventilator. The intros of the dome is carved in stepped patterns and Corinthian columns support the base of the cupola. This adds variegated colors and designs to the entire surface. There are various halls in the palace and rooms that include the grand Durbar Hall or the hall of audience, Drawing Rooms, Dining Hall, Billiard Room, Library, Bed Rooms, Toshakhana, Ladies Gallery and Vestibules. The articles and precious objects that these rooms and halls used to contain are now lost.

The original palace was partially a 3 storeyed structure, but was subsequently destroyed by the 1897 Assam earthquake.

The palace shows the acceptance of European idealism of the Koch kings.

According to the List of Monuments of National Importance in West Bengal the Cooch Behar Palace is an ASI listed monument.

See also
Cooch Behar
Cooch Behar State
Kamata Kingdom
Koch dynasty
Koch Hajo
Rajbongshi people

References

Royal residences in India
Buildings and structures in Cooch Behar district
Palaces in West Bengal
History of Cooch Behar
Monuments of National Importance in West Bengal
Tourist attractions in Cooch Behar district
Cooch Behar